The Bevatron was a particle accelerator — specifically, a weak-focusing proton synchrotron — at Lawrence Berkeley National Laboratory, U.S., which began operating in 1954. The antiproton was discovered there in 1955, resulting in the 1959 Nobel Prize in physics for Emilio Segrè and Owen Chamberlain.  It accelerated protons into a fixed target, and was named for its ability to impart energies of billions of eV. (Billions of eV Synchrotron.)

Antiprotons
At the time the Bevatron was designed, it was strongly suspected, but not known, that each particle had a corresponding anti-particle of opposite charge, identical in all other respects, a property known as charge symmetry.
The anti-electron, or positron, had been first observed in the early 1930s and theoretically understood as a consequence of the Dirac equation at about the same time.  Following World War II, positive and negative muons and pions were observed in cosmic-ray interactions seen in cloud chambers and stacks of nuclear photographic emulsions.
The Bevatron was built to be energetic enough to create antiprotons, and thus test the hypothesis that every particle has a corresponding anti-particle. In 1955, the antiproton was discovered using the Bevatron.  The antineutron was discovered soon thereafter by the team of Bruce Cork, Glen Lambertson, Oreste Piccioni, and William Wenzel in 1956, also at the Bevatron. Confirmation of the charge symmetry conjecture in 1955 led to the Nobel Prize for physics being awarded to Emilio Segrè and Owen Chamberlain in 1959.

Shortly after the Bevatron came into use, it was recognized that parity was not conserved in the weak interactions, which led to resolution of the tau-theta puzzle, the understanding of strangeness, and the establishment of CPT symmetry as a basic feature of relativistic quantum field theories.

Requirements and design
In order to create antiprotons (mass ~938 MeV/c2) in collisions with nucleons in a stationary target while conserving both energy and momentum, a proton beam energy of approximately 6.2 GeV is required.
At the time it was built, there was no known way to confine a particle beam to a narrow aperture, so the beam space was about four square feet in cross section.  
The combination of beam aperture and energy required a huge, 10,000 ton iron magnet, and a very large vacuum system.
  
A large motor-generator system was used to ramp up the magnetic field for each cycle of acceleration.  At the end of each cycle, after the beam was used or extracted, the large magnetic field energy was returned to spin up the motor, which was then used as a generator to power the next cycle, conserving energy; the entire process required about five seconds.  The characteristic rising and falling, wailing, sound of the motor-generator system could be heard in the entire complex when the machine was in operation.

In the years following the antiproton discovery, much pioneering work was done here using beams of protons extracted from the accelerator proper, to hit targets and generate secondary beams of elementary particles, not only protons but also neutrons, pions, "strange particles", and many others.

The liquid hydrogen bubble chamber

The extracted particle beams, both the primary protons and secondaries, could in turn be passed for further study through various targets and specialized detectors, notably the liquid hydrogen bubble chamber.
Many thousands of particle interactions, or "events", were photographed, measured, and studied in detail with an automated system of large measuring machines (known as "Franckensteins", for their inventor Jack Franck) allowing human operators (typically the wives of graduate students) to mark points along the particle tracks and punch their coordinates into IBM cards, using a foot pedal.  
The cards decks were then analyzed by early-generation computers, which reconstructed the three-dimensional tracks through the magnetic fields, and computed the momenta and energy of the particles. 
Computer programs, extremely complex for their time, then fitted the track data associated with a given event to estimate the energies, masses, and identities of the particles produced.

This period, when hundreds of new particles and excited states were suddenly revealed, marked the beginning of a new era in elementary particle physics.
Luis Alvarez inspired and directed much of this work, for which he received the Nobel Prize in physics in 1968.

Bevalac
The Bevatron received a new lease on life in 1971, when it was joined to the SuperHILAC linear accelerator as an injector for heavy ions.  The combination was conceived by Albert Ghiorso, who named it the Bevalac.  It could accelerate a wide range of stable nuclei to relativistic energies.  It was finally decommissioned in 1993.

End of life
The next generation of accelerators used "strong focusing", and required much smaller apertures, and thus much cheaper magnets.  The CERN PS (Proton Synchrotron, 1959) and the Brookhaven National Laboratory AGS (Alternating Gradient Synchrotron, 1960) were the first next-generation machines, with an aperture roughly an order of magnitude less in both transverse directions, and reaching 30 GeV proton energy, yet with a less massive magnet ring.  For comparison, the circulating beams in the Large Hadron Collider, with ~11,000 times higher energy and enormously higher intensity than the Bevatron, are confined to a space on the order of 1 mm in cross-section, and focused down to 16 micrometres at the intersection collision regions, while the field of the bending magnets is only about five times higher.

The demolition of the Bevatron began in 2009 and was completed in early 2012.

See also
 Alternating Gradient Synchrotron: 33 GeV strong-focusing synchrotron, next step after Bevatron
 Tevatron: Fermi Lab accelerator, 1 TeV proton-antiproton collider, largest particle accelerator built in the US (ceased operations in 2011)

References

External links

 History of the Bevatron
 "The Bevatron" E.J. Lofgren historical retrospective account; excellent early pictures.
 Pictures of the Bevatron
 Shutdown of the Bevatron
 Bevatron Building Slated for Demolition 
 Historic Atom Smasher Reduced to Rubble and Revelry
Record for the LBL-Bevatron on INSPIRE-HEP

Buildings and structures in Berkeley, California
Particle physics facilities
Particle experiments
Science and technology in the San Francisco Bay Area
Particle accelerators